Quintus Alonzo McDonald (born December 14, 1966) is a former American football linebacker who played professionally in the National Football League (NFL).

Early years
In 1984, while attending Montclair (NJ) High School, McDonald was named USA Today High School Defensive Player of the Year.

McDonald played at Penn State University as a 6'3' 259 lb. linebacker.

NFL
McDonald was drafted by the Indianapolis Colts in the 6th round of the 1989 NFL Draft (155th overall). He played in 40 games between 1989 and 1991 for the Colts. He wore jersey number 96.

References

1966 births
Living people
People from Rockingham, North Carolina
People from Montclair, New Jersey
Sportspeople from Essex County, New Jersey
Players of American football from New Jersey
American football linebackers
Penn State Nittany Lions football players
Indianapolis Colts players
Ed Block Courage Award recipients